The 2007 FIA GT Championship was the 11th season of FIA GT Championship auto racing. It was a series for Grand Touring style cars competing in two classes, GT1 and GT2, the latter being less powerful and more closely related to road-going models. Cars from National Championships (Group 2) and GT3 cars (Group 3) were also allowed to compete, but were not eligible to score championship points. The series began on 25 March 2007 and ended 21 October 2007 after 10 races.

The GT1 Drivers Championship was won by Thomas Biagi driving a Maserati MC12 GT1 for the Vitaphone Racing Team and the GT1 Teams Championship by the Vitaphone Racing Team.

Schedule

The Brazilian Mil Milhas endurance race was originally announced by the SRO as being part of the 2007 season, but instead became part of the Le Mans Series schedule.

Rule changes
The following rules were changed between the 2006 season and 2007.
 Race weekends were two days instead of three days.
 Races were two hours instead of three hours, but still required two mandatory pit stops
 Cars were allowed a maximum of three race engines for the entire season.
 Cars were required to use the same gear ratio with three different final drives throughout the entire season.
 All brakes were supplied by a single manufacturer and homologated by the FIA.
 All fuel was supplied by Shell through 2008.
 A new award was added for amateur drivers in older GT1-class cars.  Sponsored by Cessna, the Citation Cup was to be awarded to eligible teams.  Winners at each race were allowed on the GT1 podium, and the crews were awarded three hours of flight from Jetalliance.

Entries

GT1

A † symbol and gray background denotes an entry and driver competing in the Citation Cup.

GT2

Season results
Overall winners in bold.

Teams' Championship
Points are awarded to the top 8 finishers in the order of 10–8–6–5–4–3–2–1 except at the Spa 24 Hours, where half points are also granted for the leaders after 6 and 12 hours. All results obtained by a maximum of two cars per team were taken into account.

GT1 Championship for Teams - standings

GT2 Cup for Teams - standings

Manufacturers' Cup
The Manufacturers’ Cups were awarded taking into consideration all results obtained by the four best classified cars of each manufacturer, in each category, at each event. Points are awarded to the top 8 finishers in the order of 10–8–6–5–4–3–2–1 except at the Spa 24 Hours.

GT1 Manufacturers Cup - standings

GT2 Manufacturers Cup - standings

Drivers' Championship
Points are awarded to the top 8 finishers in the order of 10–8–6–5–4–3–2–1 except at the Spa 24 Hours.  Drivers who do not drive the car for a minimum distance do not score points.

GT1 Championship for Drivers - standings

GT2 Cup for Drivers - standings

Citation Cup standings
The Citation Cup was contested by non-professional drivers competing in GT1 cars. It was limited to eight rounds, with Zhuhai and Spa not included.

References

External links
 Official FIA GT Website
 2007 FIA GT Championship Sporting Regulations, www.fia.com, as archived at web.archive.org 
 2007 FIA GT Championship - Calendar & Classification, www.fia.com, as archived at web.archive.org 
 2007 FIA GT Championship - Points, www.fiagt.com, as archived at web.archive.org

 
FIA GT Championship seasons
FIA GT